Jody Watley is the debut studio album by American singer Jody Watley, released on February 23, 1987, by MCA Records. Although Watley already found success as a part of the trio Shalamar, the impact of this album made Watley a cultural style icon in contemporary R&B, pop and dance music. Its success culminated in Watley winning a Grammy Award for Best New Artist in 1988 against fellow artists Breakfast Club, Cutting Crew, Terence Trent D'Arby and Swing Out Sister. The album also produced three top-ten singles on the US Billboard Hot 100: "Looking for a New Love" (#2), "Don't You Want Me" (#6) and "Some Kind of Lover" (#10). The album has sold two million copies in the United States and over four million copies worldwide.

Track listing

CD bonus track – Track 10. "Looking for a New Love" (Extended Club Version)

Personnel 
 Jody Watley – lead vocals, backing vocals
 André Cymone – all instruments (1-4, 7, 8, 10)
 Jeff Bova – keyboards (5, 6, 9)
 Patrick Leonard – synthesizers (8), drum programming (8)
 Terrence Elliot – guitars (5, 6, 9)
 Eddie Martinez – guitars (5, 6, 9)
 John "LBJ" Staehely – guitars (5, 6, 9)
 Bruce Gaitsch – guitars (8)
 Bernard Edwards – bass (5, 6, 9)
 Tony Thompson – drums (5, 6, 9)
 Larry Schneider – saxophone (2, 3) 
 Roy Galloway – backing vocals (5, 6, 9)
 Fonzi Thornton – backing vocals (5, 6, 9)
 Gardner Cole – backing vocals (8)
 Tampa Lann – backing vocals (8)
 George Michael – lead vocals (9)

Production 
 Producers – André Cymone (tracks 1-4, 7, 8, 10); Patrick Leonard (track 8); Bernard Edwards (tracks 5, 6, 9); David Z (tracks 1-4, 7, 8, 10).
 Engineers – Josh Abbey, Darren Chadwick, Bridget Daly, Jon Ingoldsby, Glenn Kurtz, Csaba Petocz, Chris Porter and Erik Zobler. 
 Assistant engineer – Scott Church (tracks 5, 6, 9)
 Mixing – André Cymone (track 9); Coke Johnson (tracks 1-4, 7, 8, 10); Michael Verdick (track 8); David Z. (tracks 1-4, 7, 8, 10).
 Remixing – Taavi Mote and Louis Silas, Jr. (tracks 1, 10)
 Mix assistant – Michael Blum (track 8)
 Art direction and design – Lynn Robb
 Cover art concept and hair stylist – Jody Watley
 Photography – Victoria Pearson
 Make-up – Beth Katz

Awards and nominations

1987 - American Music Award Nomination for R&B/Soul Single of the Year [Looking For A New Love]
1988 - Grammy Award for Best New Artist
1988 - Soul Train Award Nomination for Album of the Year
1988 - Soul Train Award Nomination for Single of the Year [Looking For A New Love]
1988 - Soul Train Award Nomination for Best Music Video [Looking For A New Love]
1988 - MTV Video Music Award Nomination for Female Video of the Year [Some Kind Of Lover]
1988 - MTV Video Music Award Nomination for Best New Artist Video of the Year [Some Kind Of Lover]
1988 - Billboard Music Award for Top Dance / Club Play Artist of the Year

Charts

Weekly charts

Year-end charts

Singles

Certifications

See also
List of number-one R&B albums of 1987 (U.S.)

References

External links
 Jody Watley at Discogs

Jody Watley albums
1987 debut albums
MCA Records albums
Albums produced by André Cymone
Albums produced by Bernard Edwards
Albums produced by Patrick Leonard
Freestyle music albums